The flag of Oklahoma consists of a traditional Osage buffalo-skin shield with seven eagle feathers on a Choctaw sky blue field. The buffalo shield is covered by two symbols of peace: the Plains-style ceremonial pipe representing Native Americans, and the olive branch representing European Americans. Six golden brown crosses, Native American symbols for stars, are spaced on the shield. 

The blue field is inspired by the Choctaw flag adopted by the tribe in 1860 and carried though the American Civil War.  The blue field also represents devotion and loyalty. The shield surmounted by the pipe and olive branch represents defensive or protective warfare, showing a love of peace by a united people. The flag of Oklahoma is also one of only two U.S. state flags (besides New Mexico) to include distinct Native American iconography.

History

The state was named by Kiliahote, a Choctaw chief in 1866. A flag of the state would not be adopted until after statehood was achieved in 1907.

Oklahoma's first flag was adopted in 1911, four years after statehood. Taking the colors red, white, and blue from the flag of the United States, the flag featured a large centered white star fimbriated in blue on a red field. The number 46 was written in blue inside the star, as Oklahoma was the forty-sixth state to join the Union. It was designed by Ruth D. Clement, a founder of the state branch of the Daughters of the Confederacy. The original design resembles previous Confederate-inspired flags.

A contest, sponsored by the Daughters of the American Revolution, was held in 1924 to replace the flag, as red flags were closely associated with the red flag of communism. The winning entry by Louise Fluke, of Shawnee, Oklahoma, which was adopted as the state flag on April 2, 1925, resembled the current flag without the word Oklahoma on it. That word was added in 1941 in an effort to combat widespread illiteracy.

The official design of the state flag has not changed since 1941, however, unauthorized Oklahoma flag designs became prevalent throughout the state, so much so that the correct and official design of the flag was becoming lost.  These unauthorized flags displayed stylized eagle feathers, incorrectly shaped crosses, an incorrectly shaped pipe, wrong colors, or combinations of these and other errors. In 2005, an Oklahoma Boy Scout leader designing patches for a National Jamboree contingent was looking for an image of the Oklahoma state flag and noticed that there were multiple unauthorized designs of the Oklahoma state flag displayed on state government, historical, and educational websites. With some research he was able to identify the official design to use, but because of the prevalence of unauthorized designs, he contacted his state representative, and was the impetus to standardize the colors and shapes by Oklahoma Senate Bill 1359 and signed into law by Governor Brad Henry on May 23, 2006, taking effect on November 1, 2006.

In 2001, the North American Vexillological Association surveyed its members on the designs of the 72 U.S. state, territorial, and Canadian provincial flags and ranked the Oklahoma flag 39th.

In the 2010s, the first Oklahoma state flag began to be displayed as a symbol of Oklahoma's agrarian populist heritage. In 2015, a new specialty license plate honoring the first flag was authorized by the legislature and signed into law.  A minimum of 100 pre-orders were required and fulfilled.

Salute
The state legislature adopted the following salute to the flag in 1982:

"I salute the Flag of the State of Oklahoma: Its symbols of peace unite all people."

Flag of the Governor 

According to a statute adopted in 1957, the flag of the governor of Oklahoma consists of a forest green field, fringed in gold, charged with the state seal surrounded by a pentagram of five white stars. The five white stars are attributed to represent the Five Civilized Tribes first removed to then Indian Territory in the 1830s, who settled the land long before European-Americans.

See also

Flags of the U.S. states
Great Seal of the State of Oklahoma
History of the flags of the United States
Symbols of the State of Oklahoma

Notes

References

Further reading
Hickam, Mrs. Andrew R., "The State Flag of Oklahoma", Chronicles of Oklahoma,  Vol. 9, No. 1 (March, 1931), pp. 10–11.

External links

Oklahoma
Flags with crosses
Oklahoma
Symbols of Oklahoma